The Sha Tin Vase is a Group 3 Thoroughbred handicap horse race in Hong Kong, run at Sha Tin over 1200 metres in May.

Horses rated 95 and above are qualified to enter this race.

Records

Leading jockey (4 wins):
 Zac Purton – Aerovelocity (2014), Winner's Way (2018), Little Giant (2019), Thanks Forever (2020)

Leading trainer (4 wins):
 John Moore – Captain Sweet (2012), Charles The Great (2014), Not Listenin'tome (2015), Thanks Forever (2020)

Winners

See also
 List of Hong Kong horse races

References 
Racing Post:

 Racing Information of Sha Tin Vase (2011/12)
 The Hong Kong Jockey Club 

Horse races in Hong Kong

zh:沙田銀瓶